Mooresville Gymnasium, also known as the Newby Gymnasium, is a historic school gymnasium located at Mooresville, Morgan County, Indiana.  It was built in 1921, and is a one-story, rectangular, Classical Revival style wood-frame building sheathed in "oriental brick". It measures 100 feet by 75 feet with a basketball floor of 70 feet by 45 feet.

It was listed on the National Register of Historic Places in 1997.

References

School buildings on the National Register of Historic Places in Indiana
Neoclassical architecture in Indiana
School buildings completed in 1921
Buildings and structures in Morgan County, Indiana
National Register of Historic Places in Morgan County, Indiana
1921 establishments in Indiana